Fabrice Vetea Santoro (born 9 December 1972) is a French retired tennis player. Successful in both singles and doubles, he had an unusually long professional career, with many of his accomplishments coming toward the end of his career, and he is popular among spectators and other players alike for his winning demeanor and shot-making abilities; he is also one of a rare breed of player who plays two-handed on both the forehand and backhand sides.

Owing to his longevity on the tour and consistent ranking, Santoro holds several ATP records: the most career wins over top ten opponents for a player who never reached the top ten (40), the most French Open appearances (20), tied with Feliciano López, and the third-most appearances in singles competition at Grand Slam events (70) behind Roger Federer (81) and Feliciano López (80). He also has the second-most losses in singles play behind López (444).

In singles, Santoro won six titles, but reached the quarterfinals at a Grand Slam only once. His career-high ranking of world No. 17 belied his impressive record against top ten opposition.

He had greater success in doubles competition, with two Grand Slam doubles titles, one mixed doubles title, and 25 doubles championships overall to his name.

Since March 2019, Santoro has been the coach of Canadian tennis player Milos Raonic.

Career overview

Juniors
After having lost in the early rounds of the 1988 Jr French Open and 1988 Jr US Open, Santoro won the 1989 Jr French Open. He also had a semifinal appearance in the 1989 Jr US Open. He reached a career-high junior ranking of No. 3.

Junior Grand Slam results – Singles:

Australian Open: A (-)
French Open: W (1989)
Wimbledon: 3R (1989)
US Open: SF (1989)

Pro tour

When Santoro successfully defended his 2007 title by winning the 2008 Newport tournament at the age of 35, he became the oldest tennis player to win back-to-back championships at an ATP singles event.

In addition, Santoro won what was, at the time, the longest singles match in the open era: at the 2004 French Open, he beat fellow Frenchman Arnaud Clément in a 6-hour 33 minute first-round match (6–4, 6–3, 6–7(5), 3–6, 16–14). The record stood until John Isner defeated Nicolas Mahut at Wimbledon in 2010, but still remains the French Open record.

As a singles tennis player, the 2006 Australian Open was Santoro's only Grand Slam quarterfinal appearance.

In singles play, Santoro defeated 18 players who were ranked world no. 1 at some time during their careers: Novak Djokovic, Jimmy Connors, Mats Wilander, Boris Becker, Stefan Edberg, Jim Courier, Andre Agassi, Pete Sampras, Thomas Muster, Marcelo Ríos, Gustavo Kuerten, Carlos Moyá, Pat Rafter, Juan Carlos Ferrero, Marat Safin, Lleyton Hewitt, Andy Roddick, and Roger Federer (against whom he has a 2–9 record). Against other former world no. 1 players, Santoro is 0–6 against Yevgeny Kafelnikov, 0–1 against Ivan Lendl, 0–1 against Rafael Nadal, and 0–2 against Andy Murray. Santoro is famous for his winning record against Marat Safin (7–2); Safin himself has said, "Being told I would play Santoro was being told I was to die."

Santoro won the 2003 and 2004 Australian Opens doubles titles, partnering Michaël Llodra, a French compatriot, and was runner-up at the 2002 Australian Open, 2004 French Open and 2006 Wimbledon Championships. He also won the 2005 French Open mixed doubles title with Daniela Hantuchová. Santoro teamed with Michaël Llodra again to win the 2005 Tennis Masters Cup in Shanghai, a competition that included the top eight doubles teams in the world.

In addition to his doubles prowess, Fabrice is noted for his cheery attitude on court and his vast arsenal of trick shots, making him a crowd favorite and gaining him the admiration of his peers. In recognition of Santoro's varied and innovative style of play, Pete Sampras has nicknamed him The Magician.

Santoro plays with two hands on forehand and backhand, and though he is right-handed, often slices his forehand with his left hand. He attributes this to having used racquets of the same weight throughout his career, which were too heavy for a six-year-old starting off a career to hold with one hand.  Santoro was fast around the court and was a skilled defensive player.

With his participation in the 2008 Australian Open, he broke Andre Agassi's record in Grand Slam appearances over his career with a total of 62. Santoro retired at the end of the 2009 season at his hometown tournament at the 2009 BNP Paribas Masters in Paris (Bercy), losing his final singles match against James Blake and final doubles match against Johan Brunström and Jean-Julien Rojer while partnering with compatriot Sébastien Grosjean.

Santoro came out of retirement for one tournament at the 2010 Australian Open in order to obtain the record for having played in Grand Slam tournaments in four different decades, logging a total of 70 appearances in Grand Slam tournaments. At 37, he was the oldest player in the ATP top 100, being ranked 68 when he entered this last tournament. He lost in the first round of the tournament – to Marin Čilić – ending his professional tennis career.

He was the first leader of the ATP Champions Race, winning the first tournament of the year in Doha in the year the race was introduced (2000).

According to the ATP website, as of the 2019 Davis Cup Finals, Feliciano López has lost more singles matches (475) than any other professional player (active or not), surpassing the record previously held by Santoro. Overall, however, Santoro has won more than half of his matches, with a career record of 470–444.

Personal life
Santoro was born in Tahiti and grew up in La Seyne-sur-Mer, in Southern France. His father worked at Toulon's military port, and is a former footballer who later became a tennis teacher. Santoro began playing tennis as a child at the club where his father taught. 

As of 2022, Santoro divides his time between Paris and Corsica. He owns a home near Ajaccio.
 
He is a big fan of the late French comedian Michel Colucci, better known as Coluche.

Grand Slam finals

Men's doubles: 5 (2 titles, 3 runner-ups)

Mixed doubles: 1 title

Career finals

Singles (6 titles, 6 runner-ups)

Doubles (24 titles, 18 runner-ups)

Performance timelines

Singles

Doubles

Wins over top 10 players

References

External links

 
 
 
 
 
 

Australian Open (tennis) champions
French expatriate sportspeople in Switzerland
French male tennis players
French Open champions
French Open junior champions
French tennis coaches
Hopman Cup competitors
Olympic tennis players of France
Tennis players from Geneva
People from Tahiti
Tennis players at the 1992 Summer Olympics
Tennis players at the 2000 Summer Olympics
Tennis players at the 2004 Summer Olympics
1972 births
Living people
Grand Slam (tennis) champions in mixed doubles
Grand Slam (tennis) champions in men's doubles
French Polynesian sportsmen
Grand Slam (tennis) champions in boys' singles